Lovely Rita, sainte patronne des cas désespérés is a French film directed by Stéphane Clavier in 2003. The film stars his brother, Christian Clavier.

Synopsis 

Accounts expert, Edgar Lamark, is auditing the naval base of Thierry Ferrand on the Côte d'Azur. He's offered a prostitute recruited from a special website but has to get rid of the body of her previous client.

Technical details 
 Title : Lovely Rita, sainte patronne des cas désespérés
 Director: Stéphane Clavier
 Writer : Inspired by the crime novel by Benjamin Legrand (Série noire)
 Producers: Christian Clavier and Alain Doutey
 Country of origin : France
 Length : 80 minutes
 Release: 24 (France)

Starring 

 Christian Clavier : Edgar Lamarck
 Julie Gayet : Rita
 Eddy Mitchell : Thierry Ferrand
 Arielle Dombasle : Mlle Lecas
 Pierre Mondy : Marcel
 Marthe Villalonga : Renée
 Jean-Claude Dreyfus : The antique dealer
 Arnaud Giovaninetti : Kevin
 Yan Dron : Franck
 Christian Gazio : José
 Steve Tran : Danny
 Mhamed Arezki : City boy

About the film 
The idea for the film was raised by Christian Clavier after having read the crime novel Lovely Rita by Benjamin Legrand
Reviews were very poor, and the film was a commercial failure. 
 The director Stéphane Clavier is the brother of the actor and writer Christian Clavier and the nephew of producer Yves Rousset-Rouard.
The title of the film is a reference to Rita of Cascia, who is actually the saint of desperate cases.

External links 

2003 films
French comedy films
2000s French-language films
2003 comedy films
Films directed by Stéphane Clavier
2000s French films